In mathematics, and particularly in functional analysis, Fichera's existence principle is an existence and uniqueness theorem for solution of functional equations, proved by Gaetano Fichera in 1954.

See also

Notes

References

. A survey of Gaetano Fichera's contributions to the theory of partial differential equations, written by two of his pupils.
.
.
: for a review of the book, see .
. The paper Some recent developments of the theory of boundary value problems for linear partial differential equations describes Fichera's approach to a general theory of boundary value problems for linear partial differential equations through a theorem similar in spirit to the Lax–Milgram theorem.
. A monograph based on lecture notes, taken by Lucilla Bassotti and Luciano De Vito of a course held by Gaetano Fichera at the INdAM: for a review of the book, see .
.
.
. 
. An expository paper detailing the contributions of Gaetano Fichera and his school on the problem of numerical calculation of eigenvalues for general differential operators.

Banach spaces
Normed spaces
Partial differential equations
Theorems in functional analysis